Miami Supercops, in , is a 1985 Italian action comedy film starring the comedy team of Terence Hill and Bud Spencer. It was their final non-Western film together.

Synopsis
In 1978, $20 million was stolen from a Detroit bank. One of the robbers was caught, one was found dead, and the third disappeared. The money was never found. Seven years later, the robber who was caught was released from jail. He immediately went to Miami, only to be found dead the next day. Now FBI agents Doug Bennet (a cop in New York) and Steve Forest (who has opened a school for helicopter pilots in Tampa) have been called in to investigate the case while posing as Miami police officers. Somewhere in Miami the third robber is hiding with his $20 million, and he has a seven-year head start on the authorities.

References

External links

1980s police comedy films
1985 films
Terence Hill and Bud Spencer
1980s Italian-language films
English-language Italian films
1980s English-language films
Films directed by Bruno Corbucci
Films set in the United States
Italian comedy films
Films with screenplays by Luciano Vincenzoni
1985 comedy films
1985 multilingual films
Italian multilingual films
1980s Italian films
Italian action comedy films